The Pennsylvania Academy of Music (PAM) was a private music school located in Lancaster, Pennsylvania, United States. The academy provided music instruction to students with skill levels ranging from elementary to advanced.

History

The Pennsylvania Academy of Music was a 501(c)(3) nonprofit founded in 1989.

The building PAM occupied on Prince Street in downtown Lancaster is now owned by Millersville University and operates as the Ware Center.

Education

The Pennsylvania Academy of Music was one of twelve pre-collegiate autonomous schools accredited by the National Association of Schools of Music, and was a member of the National Guild of the Community Schools of the Arts. It was one of the only schools in the United States that offers a pre-collegiate program in chamber music.

In 2009, the school entered into partnerships with the China Conservatory of Music in Beijing and Lancaster Mennonite School in Lancaster.  An exchange program is offered through the China Conservatory, and a high school diploma program focused in music is offered through Lancaster Mennonite High School.

Bankruptcy

On May 27, 2010, PAM filed Chapter 11 bankruptcy. Under new administration, the Bankruptcy Court supported the re-opening the school on September 1, 2010, at Liberty Place. PAM continued to work with the Court as they tried to transition out of bankruptcy and make progress toward operating as a sustainable institution. On Wednesday, March 30, 2011, PAM chairman Dr. Thomas Godfrey announced the board of directors' decision to close the academy.

Faculty

Piano
 Mark Huber
 Jody Norton
 Dr. Ioannis Potamousis, Chair
 Dr. Ju-Ping Song
 Dr. Ina Grapenthin

Strings
 Dr. Michael T. Jamanis, violin
 Simon Andreas Maurer, violin
 Ning Mu, viola/violin
 Sara Male, cello, Chair

Winds and percussion

 Stephen Goss, percussion, Chair
 Dr. Matthew Allison, flute
 Rainer Beckmann, recorder
 Doris Hall-Gulati, clarinet
 Ryan Kauffman, saxophone

Voice

 John Darrenkamp

Other

 Ernesto Tamayo, guitar
 Dr. Matthew Allison, theory/composition
 Walter Blackburn, solfege/rythmique
 Mark Huber, jazz
 Dr. Ina Grapenthin, early development
 Heather Witmer Kares, staff accompanist

External links
Official site
Charity Navigator: Pennsylvania Academy of Music
LancasterARTS: Pennsylvania Academy of Music
Lancaster Intelligencer Journal: Academy of Music starts work on new hall, May 19, 2006
Lancaster Intelligencer Journal: Academy getting 'significant' state funds for its expansion, May 9, 2006
 Acoustical case study (video) — Pennsylvania Academy of Music

References

Education in Lancaster, Pennsylvania
Culture of Lancaster, Pennsylvania
Music schools in Pennsylvania
Schools in Lancaster County, Pennsylvania